The 1891 Lehigh football team was an American football team that represented Lehigh University as an independent during the 1891 college football season. The team compiled a 7–6 record and was outscored by a total of 198 to 174.

Schedule

References

Lehigh
Lehigh Mountain Hawks football seasons
Lehigh football